Nad Navillus is the work of Chicago artist Dan Sullivan.

Collaborators have included Rob Sullivan (bass), Andy Sullivan (vocals), Suzanne Roberts (violin, viola), Rob Bochnik (guitar), Dylan Posa (guitar), Dudley Colley (guitar), Joss Moorkens (drums, accordion, musical saw), Bill Murphy (drums), Jim Grabowski (keyboards), Dan Sylvester (drums, percussion), Justus Roe (programmed drums), and Keith Hanlon (drums).

The first release, Nad Navillus is a self-titled instrumental CD released on the ProShop label in 1999. Recorded by Joe Kaplan.

Show Your Face is the second full-length CD from Nad Navillus, released on Jagjaguwar, November 2001. Recorded by Joe Kaplan at FullPull Studio, Chicago.

Iron Night is the third full-length, again released on Jagjaguwar, November 2002. Recorded by Rob Bochnik and Greg Norman at Electrical Audio Recording, Chicago.

As Nad Navillus, Sullivan has done solo tours in Ireland, recorded for Holland's national radio, VPRO, and done extensive touring in the U.S. and Canada. Sullivan's other projects have included arranging Igor Stravinsky’s The Rite of Spring for two guitars, bass and drums (as a member of The Butchershop Quartet) as well as his involvement with the band Songs: Ohia.

Discography 
 "Irony Night" Jag51 (Jagjaguwar, released 11/02)
 "Shows Your Face" Jag37 (Jagjaguwar, released 11/01)
 "s/t ProShop 005" (released 03/99)

On other releases 
The American Pringles "The Pringles Are Coming!" ProShop 015 (released 6/05)
The Butchershop Quartet "The Rite of Spring" G4CD7701 (released 4/04)
Dave LaCrone and the Mistletones "The New Old-Fashioned Way" (12/03)
Songs: Ohia "Magnolia Electric Company" SC76 (released 02/03)
Parker Paul "Wingfoot" Jag28 (released 10/01)
Songs: Ohia “Mi Sei Apparso Come Un Fantasma” Paper Cup/White and Black (released 09/01)
Joan of Arse "Distant Hearts A Little Closer" slab4 (released 09/01)
Steve Fanagan "There is Hope" mango010 (released 07/01)
Songs: Ohia/Glen Hansard split 7-inch RR7-006 (released 12/00)
Skeeter Pete & the Sullivan Mountain Boys s/t Bert 012 (released 04/00)
A-Z Consolidated s/t ProShop 008 (released 10/99)

Compilations 
Shut Eye Records & Agency "Buzzlighter 11 - Motives" (released 2006)
An International Compilation "Performance #1" ITC 8 (released 07/02)
Tract Records "Eye of the Beholder II" TR002 (released 10/02)

Musical groups from Illinois